Jeffrey Robin Jones (born September 20, 1953) is an American-Canadian bassist who was a member of Ocean and is a member of Red Rider.

Career 

Jones performed with Alex Lifeson and John Rutsey in the first incarnation of Rush, serving as the primary singer and bassist in the summer of 1968. He was replaced by Geddy Lee in September 1968 before their second performance, after wanting to go to a party. He first gained fame as a member of the gospel rock band Ocean, which had a million-selling 1971 single "Put Your Hand in the Hand". The group disbanded in 1975. Jones later joined Red Rider, performing bass on their 1981 hit "Lunatic Fringe", and still performs with leader Tom Cochrane. He also works on videos showing Eastwood basses.

In the late 1970s, Jones played bass and sang in Stingaree, a Toronto-based band featuring Brian MacLeod and Bernie LaBarge on guitars and vocals, Doug (Skip) Layton on drums, and Larry Hamel (replaced by Don Harriss) on vocals and piano. The band had a large following in Ontario. Brian MacLeod was spotted by promoter Martin Onrot while Stingaree was playing in Toronto and left the band to join Chilliwack. The remaining members of Stingaree played for another six months before disbanding in 1978. Jones also played bass on the 1981 hit "Dream Away" by LaBarge.

Jones is a regular member of Toronto band The Carpet Frogs, who also serve as The Burton Cummings band. He also continues to tour with Tom Cochrane.

In June 2018, Jones, along with the group Roar, released the single "Naked in the Church" on Roar Records.  Chris Crerar completed the mastering on this project while it was produced by Kevin Dietz at the Metalworks Studios in Toronto.

References

External links 

Living people
Canadian rock bass guitarists
20th-century Black Canadian male singers
African-American guitarists
Rush (band) members
Red Rider members
1953 births
American emigrants to Canada
American expatriate musicians in Canada
Canadian people of African-American descent
Guitarists from Chicago
American male guitarists
21st-century Black Canadian male singers
20th-century African-American male singers
20th-century Canadian bass guitarists
21st-century Canadian bass guitarists
20th-century American guitarists
Male bass guitarists